Aleksei Gennadyevich Zhdanov (born 28 March 1982) is a Russian football coach and a former player. He is the manager of FC Rotor-2 Volgograd.

Club career
He played 3 seasons in the Russian Football National League for FC Nosta Novotroitsk and FC Luch-Energiya Vladivostok.

Honours
 Russian Second Division/Russian Professional Football League, Zone South top scorer: 2005 (15 goals), 2009 (23 goals), 2016–17 (23 goals).
 Russian Second Division, Zone South best striker: 2009.

References

External links
 

1982 births
People from Stary Oskol
Living people
Russian footballers
Association football forwards
FC Olimpia Volgograd players
FK Ventspils players
FC Zimbru Chișinău players
FC Luch Vladivostok players
FC Neftekhimik Nizhnekamsk players
FC Khimik Dzerzhinsk players
FC Sever Murmansk players
FC Zenit-Izhevsk players
FC Rotor Volgograd players
FC Armavir players
Latvian Higher League players
Moldovan Super Liga players
Russian expatriate footballers
Expatriate footballers in Latvia
Expatriate footballers in Moldova
Russian expatriate sportspeople in Latvia
Russian expatriate sportspeople in Moldova
Russian football managers
FC Nosta Novotroitsk players
Sportspeople from Belgorod Oblast